Henry Howard, 1st Earl of Northampton, KG (25 February 154015 June 1614), was an important English aristocrat and courtier. He was suspect of being Roman Catholic throughout his life, and went through periods of royal disfavour, in which his reputation suffered greatly. He was distinguished for learning, artistic culture and his public charities. He built Northumberland House in London and superintended the construction of the fine house of Audley End. He founded and planned several hospitals. Francis Bacon included three of his sayings in his Apophthegms, and chose him as "the learnedest councillor in the kingdom to present to the king his Advancement of Learning." After his death, it was discovered that he had been involved in the murder of Sir Thomas Overbury.

Early life

He was born at Shottesham, Norfolk, on 25 February 1540, the second son of Henry Howard, Earl of Surrey, the poet, and of his wife, Lady Frances de Vere, daughter of the 15th Earl of Oxford. He was the younger brother of the 4th Duke of Norfolk, and uncle of Thomas Howard, Earl of Arundel. On the execution of his father in January 1547 he and his brother and sisters were entrusted to the care of his aunt, Mary FitzRoy, Duchess of Richmond and Somerset, who employed John Foxe as their tutor. With Foxe, Howard remained at Reigate, a manor belonging to the children's grandfather, Thomas Howard, the 3rd Duke of Norfolk, throughout Edward VI's reign. On Mary's accession the Duke of Norfolk was released from prison, and he dismissed Foxe.

Afterwards Henry Howard studied with John White, Bishop of Lincoln; when White was translated to Winchester in 1556, Henry went with him. While with White, Howard read largely in philosophy, civil law, divinity, and history, and seems to have acquired a strong sympathy with Roman Catholicism. On Mary's death and Queen Elizabeth's accession, White was deprived of his bishopric, and Elizabeth undertook the charge of Howard's education. He was restored in blood 8 May 1559, following a Bill in the House of Lords in April that year. At the queen's expense he proceeded to King's College, Cambridge, where he graduated M. A. in 1564. He afterwards joined Trinity Hall, read Latin lectures on rhetoric and civil law in public, and applied to a friend in London for a master to teach him the lute. Subsequently, in 1568 he was incorporated M.A., at Oxford.

Under suspicion
He protested in 1568 to Lord Burghley that his religious views were needlessly suspected, and wrote a treatise on natural and moral philosophy for his youngest sister, Catharine, wife of Henry Berkeley, 7th Baron Berkeley, dated from Trinity Hall 6 August 1569; she supported him in some hard times. It was rumoured that he contemplated taking holy orders in the vague hope of succeeding Thomas Young as Archbishop of York. He came to court about 1570 at a low ebb, but the intrigues of which his brother, the Duke of Norfolk, was suspected at the time further depressed his prospects. When in 1572 Norfolk was charged with conspiring to marry Mary, Queen of Scots, Banister, Norfolk's confidential agent, declared in his confession that Henry Howard was himself first proposed as husband. He was arrested, but, after repeated examinations, established his innocence to Elizabeth's satisfaction, was readmitted to court, and was granted a yearly pension. It was generally reported, however, that he had by bad advice brought about his brother's ruin.

After the execution of the Duke, Howard retired to Audley End, and directed the education of his brother's children. He tried by frequent letters to Burghley and to Christopher Hatton to keep himself in favour with the queen's ministers, and managed to offer satisfactory explanations when it was reported in 1574 that he was exchanging tokens with Mary, Queen of Scots. He supplied her for many years with political information, but, according to his own account, gave her prudent advice.  Howard sought to regain Elizabeth's favour by grossly flattering her in long petitions. About 1580 he circulated a manuscript tract in support of the scheme for the marriage of Elizabeth with François, Duke of Anjou, in answer to John Stubbe's Discoverie of a Gaping Gulf (1579), and at Burghley's request began a reply to a pamphlet denouncing female government, which he completed in 1589. In 1582 his cousin Edward de Vere, 17th Earl of Oxford, quarrelled with him, and revived the charges of heresy and of treasonable correspondence with Mary. He was again arrested, and defended himself at length in a letter to Elizabeth, in which he admitted that he had taken part in Roman Catholic worship owing to conscientious difficulties on the sacramentary, but denied that he could win Mary Stuart's favour. He was soon set free, and, retiring to St. Albans, spent a year (1582–3) in writing his Preservative against the Poison of supposed Prophecies, a learned attack on judicial astrology, dedicated to Francis Walsingham, and said to have been suggested by the astrological exploits of Richard Harvey. The book was suspected of apparent heresies and concealed treason, and in 1583, after the discovery of the Throckmorton Plot, Howard was sent to the Fleet Prison. He complained to Hatton of harsh treatment. Mary, it was now asserted, had sent him a ring with a message. Burghley declined to intervene in his behalf, but by the favour of Burghley's son Robert Cecil he was sent on parole to the house of Sir Nicholas Bacon at Redgrave, Suffolk. On 19 July 1585 he wrote from there to Burghley, begging permission to visit the wells at Warwick for the benefit of his health. He was said to have travelled in Italy, visiting Florence and Rome. In 1587 his repeated requests to take an active part in resisting the threatened Spanish attack were refused. He was at the time without any means of livelihood, except his irregularly-paid pension.

In favour under James I

He attached himself both to Lord Essex and to Robert Cecil, and through the influence of the latter was in 1600 again received by Elizabeth. At the close of the Queen's reign he joined with Cecil in courting James VI, the heir to the English throne who was reigning in Scotland (in fact James suggested Howard as a trusted intermediary with Cecil). James sent him a jewel with three precious stones including a ruby. Howard sent long letters of advice, which James termed "Asiatic and endless volumes". He had success in intriguing against Sir Walter Raleigh and other rivals. On James's accession in 1603, Howard received a multitude of favours.

In 1603 he was made a Privy Counsellor, on 1 January 1604 Lord Warden of the Cinque Ports, and on 13 March Earl of Northampton and Baron Marnhull, of Marnhull in the County of Dorset; on 24 February 1605 he was given the Garter and on 29 April was appointed Lord Privy Seal. In 1609 he was elected High Steward of the University of Oxford, and in 1612 Chancellor of the University of Cambridge. The same year he was appointed one of the Commissioners of the Treasury. He was one of the judges at the trials of Walter Raleigh and Lord Cobham in 1603, of Guy Fawkes in 1605, and of Henry Garnet in 1606, in each case pressing for a conviction. In 1604 he was one of the commissioners who composed the treaty of peace with Spain, and from that date he received from the Spanish Court a pension of £1000.  In 1604, Howard called playwright Ben Jonson before the Privy Council, accusing him of popery and treason in Sejanus. In 1610 he received a royal grant of territory in Newfoundland, and the London and Bristol Company (Newfoundland Company) was set up around him for its commercial exploitation. However, In January 1608 Northampton was out of favour with Anne of Denmark and sought a recipe from the Earl of Mar to restore his position.

The Overbury case

He assisted his great-niece, Lady Essex, in obtaining her divorce from her husband (son of the 2nd Earl of Essex whom Northampton had followed in the 1590s) in order to marry the favourite Somerset, whose mistress she already was. While Northampton may have treated this as routine intrigue, the outcome was a major murder scandal. Both Northampton and her father Thomas Howard, 1st Earl of Suffolk represented her in an interview with Essex held at Whitehall in May 1613, in the hope of obtaining his assent to a divorce. Essex proved uncompliant, and Northampton contrived that the case should be brought before a special commission. When, however, the divorce was obtained, Somerset's intimate acquaintance, Sir Thomas Overbury, dissuaded him from pursuing the project of marriage with Lady Frances. Northampton recommended, on slender grounds, Overbury's imprisonment in the Tower of London, and contrived that a friend of the Howard family, Sir Gervase Helwys, should be appointed Lord Lieutenant of the Tower. Helwys frequently wrote to Northampton about Overbury's conduct and health. In his extant letters to Helwys Northampton writes with contempt of Overbury and expresses a desire that his own name should not be mentioned in connection with his imprisonment, but he introduced to Helwys John Craig, one of the royal physicians, to report on the prisoner's health. Overbury died in September, 1613. When the matter was judicially investigated, after Northampton too had died, his political enemies credited him with a direct hand in the murder. Overbury had died from the effects of poison administered by the direction of Lady Essex.

Last days
He advised against the summoning of Parliament in 1614, and then fomented disputes to compel James to dissolve it. He died unmarried on 15 June 1614 and was buried in the chapel of Dover Castle; the monument erected above his grave was subsequently removed to the chapel at Trinity Hospital, Greenwich. His title became extinct at his death. His will, in phrasing that has been considered equivocal, can be reasonably interpreted to imply that he died a Roman Catholic.

Works
He was the author of:
A Treatise of Natural and Moral Philosophy (1569; manuscript in the Bodleian Library)
A pamphlet supporting the union between Elizabeth and the duke of Anjou (1580; Harleian MSS. 180)
A Defensative against the Poyson of supposed Prophecies (1583)
A reply to a pamphlet denouncing female government (1589; Harleian Manuscript 7021)
Duello Foiled, printed in Thomas Hearne's Collection of Curious Discourses (1775), ii.225, and ascribed there to Sir Edward Coke
Translation of Charles V's Last Advice to Philip II, dedicated with a long epistle to the queen (Harl. 836, 1506 and elsewhere in Stowe 95, Kings Manuscripts 106)
Devotional writings (Arundel Manuscripts 300)
Speeches at the trials of Guy Fawkes and Garnet in State Trials, vol. I.
In Somers' Tracts (ed. 1809), ii.136, his opinions on the union between England and Scotland are recorded.

Building
He enlarged Greenwich Castle (on the site of the Royal Observatory, Greenwich), and his London residence, afterwards Northumberland House, was built at his cost from the designs of Moses Glover. He supervised John Thorpe's designs for Audley End, the residence of his nephew Suffolk. He planned and endowed three hospitals: Trinity Hospital at Clun, Shropshire; Trinity Hospital at Castle Rising, Norfolk, for twelve poor women; and a third Trinity Hospital at Greenwich, later called Norfolk College, for twelve poor natives of Greenwich, and for eight natives of Shottesham, Northampton's birthplace. He laid the foundation-stone of the college at Greenwich, 25 February 1614, and placed its management under the Mercers' Company. His connection to the Mercers was principally through Lionel Cranfield.

During the funeral of Anne of Denmark in May 1619, a large stone letter 'S' fell from the battlements of the frontispiece of Northampton House on the procession, killing one William Appleyard. According to Nathaniel Brent, the stone was "thrust down by a gentlewoman who put her foot against it, not thinking it had been so brickle [brittle]".

References
George Frederick Nott (1815), life in Surrey's and Wyatt's Poems
Anne Somerset (1997), Unnatural Murder: Poison at the Court of James I
Alan Stewart (2004), The Cradle King: A Life of James VI and I

Notes

Attribution

External links
Lord Henry Howard (1540-1614): an Elizabethan Life, by D.C. Andersson, D. S. Brewer, Woodbridge, Suffolk, 2009
Mercer Connections (PDF)

|-

|-

Earls of Northampton
English courtiers
Henry Howard, Earl of Northampton
1540 births
1614 deaths
Howard, Henry
Knights of the Garter
Lord-Lieutenants of Norfolk
Lords Privy Seal
Lords Warden of the Cinque Ports
Members of the Spanish Company
Alumni of King's College, Cambridge
Alumni of Trinity Hall, Cambridge
Chancellors of the University of Cambridge
16th-century English nobility
17th-century English nobility
People from Shotesham
Monarchs of the Isle of Man
Court of Elizabeth I